Vida Profunda is the second studio album by Colombian pianist and composer Carolina Calvache, released on 29 May 2020 on Sunnyside Records. It features vocal performances by Rubén Blades, Claudia Acuña, Haydee Milanes, Aubrey Johnson, Marta Gómez, Sofia Ribeiro, Luba Mason, Lara Bello, and Sara Serpa.

Track listing

Personnel 

Carolina Calvache – piano
Petros Klampanis – bass
Ricky Rodgiruez – bass
Peter Slavov – bass
Keita Ogawa – percussion
Jonathan Blake – drums
Tomoko Omura – violin 
Leonor Falcon – violin
Allysion Clare – viola
Brian Sanders – cello
Achilles Liarmakopoulos – trombone, producer 
Rubén Blades – vocals
Marta Gómez – vocals
Luba Mason – vocals
Sofia Ribeiro – vocals
Claudia Acuña – vocals

Lara Bello – vocals
Sara Serpa – vocals
Haydee Milanes – vocals
Ben Russell – violin
Adda Kridler – violin
Jocelin Pan – viola
Diego Garcia – cello
Samuel Torres – bongos
Hadar Noiberg – flute
Katie Scheele – oboe
Paul Won Jin Cho – bass clarinet

Production
David Darlington – mixing and mastering
Achilles Liarmakopoulos – producer
Engineers – David Stoller, Mor Mezrich

References

2020 albums